Wandal is a village in the southern state of Karnataka, India. It is located in Sindagi Taluk of Bijapur.

Demographics

2011

References 

Villages in Bijapur district, Karnataka